David Mortimer Davies (c.1840 – 18 June 1894) was a politician in colonial Victoria (Australia).

Davies was born in Blaina, Monmouthshire, Wales, son of Thomas Davies, a miner, and his wife Annie, née Lewis.  Davies was educated for the ministry at the Brecon Independent College, in that principality, but, his views having undergone a change in regard to some important religious doctrines, he resigned his charge, and entered on agricultural pursuits.

Davies emigrated to South Australia, arriving at Adelaide in 1866, and removed thence to Ballarat, in Victoria, the next year, where he engaged in agricultural pursuits, in the Buninyong district. Davies was elected a member of the Victorian Legislative Assembly for Grenville in May 1877, and represented the constituency until his death on 18 June 1894. He is a strong Liberal and Protectionist, and was Government whip during the Graham Berry régime. In October 1887 he joined the Gillies-Deakin Cabinet, but held no portfolio till June 1889, when he became Commissioner of Public Works and Vice-President of the Board of Land and Works. From June to November 1890 he was Minister of Mines in the same Government, resigning with his colleagues at the latter date.

Davies died in Ballarat, Victoria, Australia on 18 June 1894, survived by his wife (Sarah née Phillips) and by five sons and one daughter.

References

1840s births
1894 deaths
Members of the Victorian Legislative Assembly
Welsh emigrants to colonial Australia
People from Blaina
19th-century Australian politicians